Henok is a male given name of Eritrean and Ethiopian origin that is related to the name Enoch. Notable people with the name include:

Henok Achido (born 1982), Swedish rap artist (see :sv:Henok Achido)
Henok Goitom (born 1984), Swedish soccer player
Henok Tesfaye Heyi (born 1990), Ethiopian middle-distance runner

See also
Henock, a related name

Amharic-language names
Masculine given names